In the men's synchronized 10 metre platform event at the 2015 European Diving Championships, the winning pair were Patrick Hausding and Sascha Klein from Germany.

Medalists

Results

Green denotes finalists

2015 European Diving Championships